Asa Akira (born January 3, 1985) is an American pornographic actress and adult film director. Akira has appeared in over 505 adult films as of May 2016. In 2013, she became the third Asian performer (after Asia Carrera and Stephanie Swift) to win the AVN Female Performer of the Year Award. Akira hosted the 1st and 2nd ceremonies for the Pornhub Awards.

Career

Akira began working as a dominatrix when she was 19 years old. She later worked as a stripper at the Hustler Club in New York. In 2006–2007 she was a regular on the Bubba the Love Sponge radio show and was known as the "Show Whore". Her first boy-girl scene was with Travis Knight for Gina Lynn Productions, after having already done several girl-girl scenes, mainly with Lynn. She then signed a contract with Vouyer Media before becoming a freelancer six months later. Asa is her real first name, which means "morning" in Japanese, and the last name in her stage name was taken from the anime film Akira. Akira is of Japanese descent and is from New York; she spent her formative years in Japan before moving back to the United States in her teens.

Akira received several award nominations for her role in David Aaron Clark's 2009 film, Pure, in which she plays a telephonist at a fetish dungeon who has an affair with the head-mistress' husband.

Akira co-hosted the 30th Annual AVN Awards alongside pornographic actress Jesse Jane and comedian April Macie. She won the AVN Female Performer of the Year Award that night. She was also the most awarded person during that ceremony.

In 2013, she made her directorial debut with Elegant Angel's Gangbanged 6.

On October 9, 2013, Akira announced that she signed an exclusive performing contract with Wicked Pictures. Her debut film as a contract performer for the company was Asa Is Wicked.

Mainstream appearances
Akira made a cameo appearance in the mainstream film Starlet.

In January 2014, Akira, Dana DeArmond, Chanel Preston, and Jessie Andrews were featured in a Cosmopolitan magazine article titled "4 Porn Stars on How They Stay Fit." The article was inspired by actress Gabrielle Union's comment made on Conan O'Brien's talk show about striving to follow the fitness routines of the porn stars she saw at her gym.

In 2014, Akira featured as a guest in episode 1 of season 3 of the Eric Andre Show.

In 2017, Akira appeared as herself in the first episode of the sixteenth season of Family Guy in a live-action casting couch cutaway scene with Peter Griffin. Akira later noted that, ironically, this was her first casting couch scene. The episode featured a recurring joke of people asking Peter "who was the girl on the couch" and Peter giving a deadpan reply that he is certain each inquirer already knows who she is.

Other media

In 2011, Complex ranked Akira fourth on their list of "The Top 100 Hottest Porn Stars Right Now" and at sixth on their list of "The Top 50 Hottest Asian Porn Stars of All Time". LA Weekly ranked her third on their list of "10 Innovative Porn Stars Who Could Be the Next Sasha Grey" in 2013. She was also placed on CNBC's yearly list "The Dirty Dozen", the site's annual ranking of the adult industry's most popular and successful stars in 2012, 2013, and 2014.

In 2013 Akira and artist David Choe started a podcast featuring 90-minute episodes called DVDASA. It is aimed at a young adult audience, with its goal being to help youth with their problems related to sexuality, career, relationships, etc.

In June 2014, Akira appeared on a YouTube video with vlogger Caspar Lee.

Akira wrote a memoir titled Insatiable: Porn—A Love Story which was released in May 2014 by Grove Press. In July 2015, she signed a contract with Cleis Press to publish her second book, titled Dirty Thirty: A Memoir, a collection of essays, which was released in the fall of 2016.

In 2015, Akira replaced Belle Knox as the host of The Sex Factor, an upcoming reality show where eight men and eight women compete for a $1 million prize and a three-year porn contract.

On April 6, 2015, The Hundreds started releasing episodes for a series titled Hobbies with Asa Akira, which features Akira trying out different activities such as tattooing, boxing, taxidermy, and ice sculpting.

Personal life
Akira states that she is sexually attracted to both men and "girls that look like boys". She dislikes being called bisexual, claiming to lean towards heterosexuality, but to still be uncertain. She was once engaged to former pornographic actor Rocco Reed. She was also married to pornographic actor and director Toni Ribas, and she stated that aside from their on-screen work, their relationship was monogamous. 

Akira identifies as a feminist.

Publications

References

Further reading

External links

 
 
 
 
 

1985 births
21st-century American actresses
American dominatrices
American female adult models
American female erotic dancers
American erotic dancers
American feminists
American memoirists
American women podcasters
American podcasters
American pornographic film actresses
American pornographic film directors
Barstool Sports people
Living people
Women pornographic film directors
American women memoirists
American pornographic film actors of Japanese descent
American film directors of Japanese descent
American models of Japanese descent
American writers of Japanese descent
Pornographic film actors from New York (state)
Models from New York City